Rumah Gadang (Minangkabau: "big house") or Rumah Bagonjong "house for the Minangkabau people" (Minangkabau: "spired roof house") are the traditional homes of the Minangkabau in West Sumatra, Indonesia. The architecture, construction, internal and external decoration, and the functions of the house reflect the culture and values of the Minangkabau. A Rumah Gadang serves as a residence, a hall for family meetings, and for ceremonial activities. In the matrilineal Minangkabau society, the Rumah Gadang is owned by the women of the family who live there; ownership is passed from mother to daughter.

The houses have dramatic curved roof structure with multi-tiered, upswept gables. Shuttered windows are built into walls incised with profuse painted floral carvings. The term Rumah Gadang usually refers to the larger communal homes, however, smaller single residences share many of its architectural elements.

In West Sumatra, traditional Rumah Gadang reflect the province’s Minangkabau people, and has become the symbol of West Sumatra and Minangkabau culture. Throughout the region, numerous buildings demonstrate the design elements of Rumah Gadang, including genuine vernacular timber masonry structures built for customary ceremonies, to the more mundane modern structure like those of government offices and public facilities. Today, Rumah Gadang architectural elements, especially its  horn-like curved roof can be found in modern structures, such as governor and regencies office buildings, marketplaces, hotels, facade of Padang restaurants and Minangkabau International Airport. An , however, is the largest and most magnificent example of this traditional style.

Background

Sumatra is the sixth largest island in the world and since the time of Marco Polo has been referred to as the 'island of gold'. It is the most resource-rich island of Indonesia, including its tea, pepper and rubber plantations, and oil, tin and other mineral resources. Lying on the equator, Sumatra has a monsoonal climate and, although more rain falls between October and May, there is no extended rainless dry season. Despite large-scale deforestation, Sumatra still has millions of acres of unexploited rainforests that provide building materials. The great hardwood trees required for large scale construction are now, however, in strictly limited supply.

Sumatra is home to one of the most diverse range of peoples in the Southeast Asian archipelago. The most common housing forms have traditionally been wooden and raised on piles, built of locally gathered materials, with steeply pitched, roofs. In addition to the Minangkabau's , the Batak of Lake Toba region build the boat-shaped  with dominating carved gables and dramatic oversize roofs, and the people of Nias build the fortified  houses on massive ironwood pillars with towering roof structures.

The Minangkabau are indigenous to the highlands of central Sumatra. Their culture is matrilineal, with property and land being passed down from mother to daughter; religious and political affairs are the province of men. Minangkabau  was derived from animistic and Hindu-Buddhist beliefs before the arrival of Islam, and remnants of animistic beliefs exist even among some practicing Muslims. As such, women are customarily the property owners; husbands are only tolerated in the house at certain times and under special conditions and must return to their sisters' house to sleep. Complementing this practice is the custom of  whereby many of the men will travel far afield for work, returning only periodically to their village of origin. Money earned on these trips is remitted for the building of contemporary .

Form

A communal  is a long house, rectangular in plan, with multiple gables and upsweeping ridges, forming buffalo horn-like ends. They normally have three-tiered projections, each with varying floor levels. Unlike the Batak Toba homes, where the roof essentially creates the living space, the Minangkabau roof rests on conventional walls. Cooking and storage areas are often in separate buildings.

The house is largely constructed of wood; an exception being the rear longitudinal wall which is a plain lattice woven in a chequered pattern from split bamboo. The roof is of a truss and cross-beam construction and is typically covered with thatch from the fibre of the sugar palm, the toughest thatch material available and said to last a hundred years. The thatch is laid in bundles which can be easily fitted to the curved, multi-gabled roof. Contemporary homes, however, are more frequently using corrugated iron in place of thatch. Roof finials are formed from thatch bound by decorative metal bindings and drawn into points said to resemble buffalo horns — an allusion to a legend concerning a battle between two water buffaloes from which the 'Minangkabau' name is thought to have been derived. The roof peaks themselves are built up out of many small battens and rafters.

The women who share the house have sleeping quarters set into alcoves – traditionally odd in number –  that are set in a row against the rear wall and curtained off by the vast interior space of the main living area. Traditionally, large communal  will be surrounded by smaller homes built for married sisters and daughters of the parent family. It is the responsibility of the women's maternal uncle to ensure that each marriageable woman in the family has a room of her own. To this end he will build either a new house or, more commonly, annexes to the original one. It is said that the number of married daughters in a home can be told by the counting its horn-like extensions; as they are not always added symmetrically,  can sometimes look unbalanced. Adolescent boys traditionally live in the village , a small mosque.

Architectural elements

Each element of a  has its own symbolic meaning, which is referred to in  speech and aphorisms. The elements of a  includes:

 , hornlike roof structure
 , triangular wall under the ends of 
 , shelf under the 
 , raised floor at the end of one style of 
 , the walls on the side elevations
 , the walls on the front and back elevations
 , front facade
 , a shelf or middle band on the periphery of the house
 , wall enclosing space under a house that has been built on stilts

The peaks of the roof are said to represent buffalo horns as well as reaching to god mentioned earlier.

The pillars of the ideal  are arranged in five rows which run the length of the house. These rows divide the interior into four long spaces called . The  at the rear of the house is divided into bedrooms.

The , contains rice for the family, particularly for  ceremonies. The  contains rice for donation to poor villagers and for times of famine in the village. The  contains rice for the daily needs of the family.

Ornamentation

The Minangkabau traditionally embellish the wooden walls, pillars, and ceilings of the Rumah Gadang with bas-relief carved wooden motifs that reflect and symbolize their . The motifs comprise profuse floral designs based on a simple underlying geometric structure. The motifs are similar to those of the Minangkabau woven  textiles, with colors thought to have been derived from Chinese brocades. Traditionally, the motifs do not show animals or humans in a realistic form, although some may represent animals, human beings, or their activities or behavior. The motifs are based on the Minangkabau concept of aesthetics, which is part of their view of their world (Alam Minangkabau) in which expression is always based upon the natural environment. A well-known  aphorism says, 'nature is our teacher.

Variations

These forms reflect different two variations of Minangkabau social structure. The  design reflects an aristocratic and hierarchical social structure, with the house containing  (raised floors) at each end to permit elevated seating of clan leaders during ceremonial events. The  design reflects a democratic social structure, with the floors being flat and on one level.

Large communal homes are entered through a doorway in the centre of the structure which is usually surrounded by a perpendicular porch with a triangular gable and upsweeping peaked ridge end.

The larger and more opulent houses, have higher walls and multiple roofs, often with five elements inserted into each other, and supported by large wooden columns.

The Pagaruyung Palace is built in the traditional Minangkabau  architectural style, but one unusual aspect is that it has three levels. In West Sumatra some modern government and commercial buildings, and domestic houses, have adopted elements of the  style.

There has been a sizable Minangkabau settlement in Negeri Sembilan (now in Malaysia) since the seventeenth century, with the chief of the Minangkabau still ruler there. The Negeri Sembilan Minangkabau, however, have adopted the Malay-style roof construction, with continuous ridge piece thatched with lengths of palm-leaf attached to battens. Although this has meant the loss of the characteristic curved roof and has blunter eaves, it is still considered dignified and beautiful. More orthodox Islamic influence has also led to variations such as modifications to the interior layout, as women are more restricted to the rear of the house than in the case of the matrilineal Sumatran Minangkabau.

Construction

See also

Architecture of Indonesia
Architecture of Sumatra

References

Citations

Sources 

 General references
 
 

 

Rumah adat
Minangkabau
Architecture in Indonesia
Architecture in Malaysia